A by-election was held for the New South Wales Legislative Assembly electorate of Moree on 12 December 1903 because of the resignation of William Webster to successfully contest the federal seat of Gwydir. The Labour candidate Matthew Boland withdrew and his replacement, Leonard Court, was not nominated in time.

Dates

Result

William Webster resigned to successfully contest the federal seat of Gwydir. Leonard Court was not nominated in time.

See also
Electoral results for the district of Moree
List of New South Wales state by-elections

Notes

References

1903 elections in Australia
New South Wales state by-elections
1900s in New South Wales